Yuri Ivanovich Lykov (born 27 April 1961) is a Russian professional football coach and a former player.

External links
 

1961 births
Living people
Association football defenders
Soviet footballers
Soviet Top League players
FC SKA Rostov-on-Don players
Russian football managers